Acmetal, alternatively Akmetal or "AC metal", meaning "peak capital" or "best capital", is a universal currency that was proposed by Kazakhstan's President Nursultan Nazarbayev.

Etymology
Akmetal is a portmanteau of the Greek word “acme” – the highest point or zenith – and “capital.”

Reaction
A one-global currency prompts the creation of a one-global central bank to manage the currency, thereby superseding the authority of national central banks like the Federal Reserve in the United States and the European Central Bank.

The A.P. said: Nazarbayev’s proposal has raised eyebrows in some quarters, but the idea was embraced by Robert Mundell, who won the Nobel prize for economics in 1999 for helping lay the theoretical groundwork for Europe’s single currency. “It would be a very good idea if the G-20 took that idea up in London,” Mundell said.

The International Monetary Fund said that the currency idea was "interesting, but poorly explored".

References

External links 

Reuters reported : "New reserve currency could come quickly"
Acmetal

Proposed currencies
Government of Kazakhstan
Nursultan Nazarbayev